Pago de La Jaraba is a Spanish winery in Castilla–La Mancha, Spain. The winery uses the Vino de Pago wine appellation, a classification for Spanish wine applied to individual vineyards or wine estates, unlike the Denominación de Origen Protegida (DOP) or Denominación de Origen Calificada (DOCa) which is applied to an entire wine region. The Pago de La Jaraba winery was formed as a Vino de Pago in 2019, and geographically it lies within the extent of the La Mancha DOP. The winery also produces artisan Manchego cheese under the D.O.P. queso manchego appellation. Queso baja calidad

See also
List of Spanish cheeses

References

External links

 Pago de La Jaraba official website

Wine regions of Spain
Spanish wine
Appellations
Wine classification